The Zbrojovka Z 9 was a car produced by Československá Zbrojovka in the 1930s. First shown in 1929, the car had a conventional design, with a liquid-cooled two cylinder two stroke mounted at the front driving the rear wheels. In addition to a four door open top phaeton body, the car was also produced as a two-door to order, as both a roadster and a sedan, and a doorless pickup. Production ran until 1932, with a total of 850 produced.

Design
At the Prague Motor Show October 1929, Zbrojovka showed a slightly larger car than the Z 18 designed for a more upmarket customer. The car was put into production in 1930 as the Z 9 to replace the earlier vehicle. The Z 9 was of a conventional front-engine, rear-wheel drive layout, with drum brakes on all wheels, rigid axles, a three speed manual gearbox and a Gleason rear differential. The car was equipped with a  fuel tank, ran on a fuel to oil ration of 33:1 and had a 12V electric starter.

The basic body style was a four door open top phaeton which was available in black and cost 42,000 Kčs. Other vehicles were fitted with bodies produced by third parties, including two door cabriolet and semi-cabriolet designs created by Fischer of Brno and Brožík of Plzeň, and a four door cabriolet produced by Sodomka. In addition to the various passenger car models, the Z 9 was produced as a doorless pickup.

Performance

The car saw moderate success as a racing machine. Antonin Kahle and Rudolf Müttermüller completed a European cross-country race that started from Berlin in May 1931 and covered  in ten countries from Portugal to Yugoslavia in a Z 9, finishing in June. The Kroup brothers were unsuccessful in their bid to win the 1931 Monte Carlo Rally, retiring after losing their way in fog near Lyon.

Production
The car was produced between October 1930 and June 1932, with a total of 850 vehicles manufactured of all body styles.

References

Cars introduced in 1929
Cars of the Czech Republic
Rear-wheel-drive vehicles